Las Palmas Naval Base, also known as Arsenal of Las Palmas, is a military base and arsenal of the Spanish Navy located in the city of Las Palmas, Spain. It is the largest military base of the Spanish Navy on the African continent.

History
In 1922 the Association of Fruit Exporters of Las Palmas began the construction of a dock on the ruins of the Royal Castle of Santa Catalina. During World War II, because of the continuous presence of warships of the belligerent countries, the Spanish State took the decision to establish a permanent naval base in the Canary Islands. In 1941 it was temporarily expropriated by the government.

In 1948, the Arsenal of Las Palmas was formally established at the Nuestra Señora del Pino dock, the Air Force's Seaplane Base. More land was later purchased, allowing the construction of several buildings, named after the first Chief of the Arsenal.

During the 1950s two docks were constructed to accommodate submarines. In 2000, the Spanish Navy Marines Corps of Canaries moved from the Manuel Lois Barracks to the Arsenal, where several buildings were converted to accommodate the necessary offices and storerooms.

Ships
 Buques de Acción Marítima  (Offshore patrol vessel)
 Meteoro
 Rayo
 Relámpago
 Tornado

See also
 Rota Naval Base
 Cartagena Naval Base

References

Military installations of Spain
Spanish Navy bases
Las Palmas